Mona Lisa Smile is a 2003 American drama film produced by Revolution Studios and Columbia Pictures in association with Red Om Films Productions, directed by Mike Newell, written by Lawrence Konner and Mark Rosenthal, and starring Julia Roberts, Kirsten Dunst, Julia Stiles, and Maggie Gyllenhaal. The title is a reference to the Mona Lisa, the famous painting by Leonardo da Vinci, and to the song of the same name, originally performed by Nat King Cole, which was covered by Seal for the movie. Julia Roberts received a record $25 million for her performance, the highest ever earned by an actress at that time.

Plot
In 1953, Katherine Ann Watson, a 30-year-old graduate student in the Department of Art History at UCLA and Oakland State, takes a position teaching the history of art at Wellesley College.

At her first class, Katherine discovers her students have memorized the entire textbook and syllabus, so she introduces them to modern art and encourages discussion about what is good art. Katherine comes to know them, seeking to inspire them to achieve more than marriage.

Highly opinionated Elizabeth "Betty" Warren is outspokenly conservative. She does not understand why Katherine is not married and insists a universal standard exists for good art. She writes editorials for the college paper, exposing campus nurse Amanda Armstrong as a supplier of contraception, resulting in her termination.

Other editorials attack Katherine for advocating that women seek a career instead of being wives and mothers. Betty cannot wait to marry Spencer and expects the traditional exemptions from attending class as a married woman; however, Katherine insists she will be marked on merit.

Constance "Connie" Baker begins dating Betty's cousin, Charlie, but Betty tells her he is together with Deb MacIntyre. Connie ends the relationship, believing Betty. However, some weeks later, Connie and Charlie reconnect, with him telling her he had stopped seeing Deb after the previous summer.

Joan Brandwyn considers to study law, so Katherine encourages her to apply to Yale Law School. Accepted, she still opts to play the traditional role of a housewife to Tom Donegal. She tells Katherine that choosing to be a wife and mother does not reduce her intelligence.

Giselle Levy has several lovers and liberal views about sex. She admires Katherine for encouraging the students to be independent, but earns Betty's enmity.

Katherine declines a marriage proposal from her California boyfriend, as she does not love him enough and begins seeing the Wellesley Italian professor, Bill Dunbar. He is charming and full of stories about Europe and his heroic actions in Italy during the war. He has also had affairs with students, including Giselle, and Katherine makes him promise he will stop.

The relationship progresses, but, when Katherine learns that Bill spent the entire war at the Army Languages Center on Long Island, she breaks up with him. He responds that Katherine did not come to Wellesley to help the students find their way, but rather her way.

Betty's marriage falls apart after Spencer severely neglects her and Giselle sees him kissing another woman. Rather than offering support, Betty’s mother orders her to return to her husband. Betty visits Giselle in her dorm, at first attacking her for her promiscuity, but eventually allowing Giselle to comfort her. In turn, Betty regrets how she has treated Katherine with her poor behavior. Eventually, influenced by her, Betty files for divorce and looks with Giselle for an apartment in Greenwich Village.

When Betty’s mother confronts her for what she has done, she reveals her frustration with her for not supporting her when she asked for it. She says the only person who cared about her enough to help her out was Katherine. Therefore, Betty reveals she is going to have a life of her own.

Katherine's course is highly popular, so she is invited to return, but under certain conditions: she must follow the syllabus, submit lesson plans for approval, stop giving private advice to scholars and keep a strictly professional relationship with all faculty members and students.

Katherine decides to leave to explore Europe. In the final scene, Betty dedicates her last editorial to Katherine, calling her "an extraordinary woman who lived by example and compelled us all to see the world through new eyes." As she leaves in a taxi, all her students follow on their bicycles, with Betty reaching to say goodbye until the taxi speeds away.

Cast

 Julia Roberts as Katherine Ann Watson
 Kirsten Dunst as Elizabeth "Betty" Warren (Jones)
 Julia Stiles as Joan Brandwyn (Donegal)
 Maggie Gyllenhaal as Giselle Levy
 Ginnifer Goodwin as Constance "Connie" Baker
 Laura Allen as Susan Delacorte
 Tori Amos as wedding singer
 Emily Bauer as a student
 Jordan Bridges as Spencer Jones
 Marcia Gay Harden as Nancy Abbey
 Lisa Roberts Gillan as Miss Albini
 Topher Grace as Tommy Donegal
 Annika Marks as a student
 Donna Mitchell as Mrs. Warren
 Ebon Moss-Bachrach as Charlie Stewart
 Lily Rabe as a student
 Krysten Ritter as a student
 Terence Rigby as Dr. Edward Staunton
 Marian Seldes as President Jocelyn Carr
 John Slattery as Paul Moore
 Juliet Stevenson as Amanda Armstrong
 Dominic West as Bill Dunbar
Denis Cagdan as the Goat

Soundtrack

Box office
In its first weekend, Mona Lisa Smile opened at number two at the U.S. box office, earning US$11,528,498 behind The Lord of the Rings: The Return of the King. By the end of its run, while the film had grossed a respectable $141,337,989 worldwide, its U.S. domestic gross did not meet its $65 million budget, falling short at $63,860,942.

Reception
Mona Lisa Smile received mixed to negative reviews from film critics. On Metacritic, the film has a weighted average score of 45 out of 100, based on 40 critics, indicating "mixed or average reviews".

In a typical review, Claudia Puig of USA Today wrote, "it's Dead Poets Society as a chick flick, without the compelling drama and inspiration... even Roberts doesn't seem convinced. She gives a rather blah performance as if she's not fully committed to the role... Rather than being a fascinating exploration of a much more constrained time in our social history, the film simply feels anachronistic. The film deserves a solid 'C' for mediocrity and muted appeal." Critic Elizabeth M. Tamny of the Chicago Reader shared this negative assessment, writing "Part of the problem is simply that Mona Lisa Smile is a Hollywood film, and Hollywood isn't good at depicting the life of the mind... And Julia Roberts is no help--you either like her or you don't, but either way it has little to do with talent. She's not so much an actor as a vessel for earnest reactions. The fact is... It's easier to take on an extremely black-and-white version of the most salient question from this film - can women bake their cake and eat it too? - than try to answer it in the present."

David Ansen of Newsweek wrote, "What drew the usually astute Mike Newell ('Four Weddings and a Funeral', 'Donnie Brasco') to this project? There are hints that the script (credited to Mark Rosenthal and Lawrence Konner) may once have had more shadings - a suggestion that Katherine's idealism is a form of power-tripping; that she's afraid of intimacy - but any ambiguity is quickly brushed aside to make way for the Julia lovefest. Newell, no hack, tries not to milk the cliches shamelessly, and that may be the movie's final undoing. Lacking the courage of its own vulgarity, 'Mona Lisa Smile' is as tepid as old bathwater."

Accolades

Reaction from Wellesley and Wellesley alumnae
The college issued an official statement explaining their decision to allow the film to shoot on campus.

In a message to Wellesley alumnae concerning the film, Wellesley College president Diana Chapman Walsh expressed regret about some of the reactions it generated, given that many alumnae from the 1950s felt that the film's portrayal of Wellesley was inaccurate.

References

External links

 Julia Roberts interview for Mona Lisa Smile
 
 
 
 
 

2003 films
2003 romantic drama films
American coming-of-age drama films
American romantic drama films
2000s English-language films
2000s Italian-language films
2000s feminist films
Films directed by Mike Newell
Films scored by Rachel Portman
Films about educators
Films set in 1953
Films set in the 1950s
Films set in Massachusetts
Films shot in Connecticut
Films shot in New York (state)
Films shot in New Jersey
Films shot in Massachusetts
Films shot in California
Revolution Studios films
Columbia Pictures films
Films set in universities and colleges
2000s coming-of-age drama films
2000s female buddy films
2000s American films